Hauptkirche (German for "Main Church") may refer to five churches in the city of Hamburg:

St. Michael's Church, Hamburg
St. Nicholas' Church, Hamburg
St. Peter's Church, Hamburg
St. James' Church, Hamburg
St. Catherine's Church, Hamburg